Plomer is a surname. Notable people with the surname include:

Plomer baronets
John Plomer ( 1410– 1483), English composer
Michèle Plomer (born 1965), Canadian writer and translator
William Plomer (1903–1973), South African and British writer

See also
 Ploner
 Plumer (disambiguation)